Iara oil field is a large ultra-deepwater pre-salt oil field located in the Santos Basin,  off the coast of Rio de Janeiro, Brazil, north of Tupi oil field.

Etymology 
The field was named in honor of the Iara figure from Brazilian mythology.

History 
The field was discovered on 7 August 2008 with an encounter of light oil which measured between 26 and 30° API. The field is believed to hold approximately 3-4 billion barrels of light oil and natural gas. This amount equals to the country internal demand of 5 years. BG Group announced that the discovery was three times larger than initially expected. Due to their formations, fields in Santos Basin are very difficult and costly to exploit.

Ownership 
BM-S-11 block, which contains Iara oil field, is operated by Petrobras with controlling 65% of the stake while BG Group holds a 25% and Galp Energia holds 10% of the share. As per Bear Stearns estimates, the value of oil in the block ranges from $25 billion to $60 billion. BM-S-11 also includes Tupi Sul, Tupi and Iracema fields.

Reservoir 
The reservoir of Iara oil field is the pre-salt Guaratiba Group. It is yet unconfirmed whether Iara is the extension of Tupi oil field since there are large unexplored areas between the two fields. According to Julio Bueno, economic policy secretary at Rio de Janeiro state, the whole area may contain as much as 70 billion barrels of crude oil which would require an estimated $600 billion to develop the fields.

See also 

 Campos Basin
 Tupi oil field
 Iracema oil field

References

External links 
 Petrobras Maps of the area showing Tupi and Iara fields

Oil fields of Brazil
Santos Basin
Petrobras oil and gas fields
Tupi–Guarani languages
Galp Energia